Florian Schneeberger (born 13 March 1971) is an Austrian former sailor. He competed in the Tornado event at the 1996 Summer Olympics.

References

External links
 

1971 births
Living people
Austrian male sailors (sport)
Olympic sailors of Austria
Sailors at the 1996 Summer Olympics – Tornado
Sportspeople from Erlangen